Patrice Iteke Wilson is a Nigerian-American record producer, songwriter, and singer. He has also adopted the stage name Pato for some of his performances. He founded ARK Music Factory with Clarence Jey in 2010. While there, he produced songs such as "Friday" sung by Rebecca Black which gained worldwide attention on YouTube. In 2011, he established Pato Music World (PMW) after leaving ARK. In December 2017, he announced that he had closed down PMW.

Early life
Patrice Wilson was born in Nigeria, the son of a Nigerian father who worked as a chemical engineer and an English-Irish mother who was a church minister. In Nigeria, he studied at Wilson Prep School (a Christian school established by his mother), Zamani College, and Essence International School. Wilson's musical beginnings were when he sang in his mother's church and helped out with youth programs at school. Later, he attended school in Europe and trained in track and field events. He began touring as a backup singer with Malian-Slovak pop star Ibrahim Maiga. He toured in the Czech Republic, Slovakia, Poland, and other European countries, and speaks fluent Slovak. He also performed on Slovak television and was an aspiring athlete, training under the supervision of a professional Russian coach for a possible qualification representing Nigeria in the track and field event at the Olympics.

Wilson moved to the U.S. in 1999, where he took his flavor of Nigerian music along with the style of music he had performed in Eastern Europe and combined it with new-age hip-hop. He studied at Whitworth University in Spokane, Washington, before moving to Los Angeles in 2007 to join the music business. Under the stage name Pato, he also did modelling for various brands. He worked for a while trying to promote his own musical career before deciding to produce for other potential artists instead. He got married in 2008 to a woman from Spokane who moved with him to California.

ARK Music Factory

In 2010 he co-founded ARK Music Factory in partnership with Clarence Jey, an Australian record producer, songwriter and multi-instrumentalist musician. He chose the name "Ark" because of his Christian background. Jey left ARK Music Factory in May 2011 with Wilson remaining the CEO of the company. Wilson and Jey co-authored and co-produced the song "Friday" sung by Rebecca Black. He was also responsible for writing and producing songs for a number of young artists.

Following the huge mostly negative attention Rebecca Black's "Friday" received, a song that Wilson had written and the video in which he also appeared, a lot of speculation arose that he may have been exploiting young aspiring singers. Wilson rebuffed such claims, saying that the label provided a "relatively inexpensive" way of entry into the pop market for artists:

I'm getting a lot of criticism saying I'm exploiting rich kids and their parents, but find me another company that would do all this at a cost this low. I don't promise anyone fame. In fact, if someone approaches me with their only goal to 'get famous,' I tell them they're not in this for the right reasons.

Wilson went public in a promotional interview tape explaining what was behind the company he had founded. He also released two music responses about "Friday" and the controversy it created. The first was posted on March 13, 2011 entitled "Friday (Rap Remix)" written and produced by Wilson and Clarence Jey, the second on April 4, 2011 entitled "Say What You Wanna Say" written by Wilson and Kustom. Both songs address some of the most common grievances against the song and in the way ARK runs its business. Both these postings have received negative attraction as well.

One Week to Hit It Big: Pop Star
Wilson appeared in One Week to Hit It Big: Pop Star, the ABC show Good Morning Americas (GMA) one-week special feature. After auditions of tens of candidates, the final line-up of candidates were Linnea Sult, Lexi St. George, Madeline Ralston, all 14, and Samantha Ramirez, 12. Wilson chose Lexi St. George for the ABC GMA challenge of trying to make a viral star in one week. She recorded the song "Dancing to the Rhythm", co-written for the show by Wilson and Steve Sulikowski and produced by Wilson. A music video was made in one day and was launched on the GMA program on June 30, 2011.

Pato Music World / PMW Live

In 2011, he established Pato Music World (PMW), later rebranded as PMW Live. On May 6, 2012, Wilson released an "official sequel" to the infamous Rebecca Black song "Friday". The "sequel" called "Happy" (alternatively "Happy (The Official Sequel to Friday)" or "The H.A.P.P.Y. Song"), that features Antoine Dodson and Lela Brown and focuses on Saturdays, with plenty of remarks to Friday and self-deprecating music video to boot. Previously, Wilson had also written a song called "Tuesday" for British journalist Jon Ronson.

Other releases
"It's Thanksgiving" was released by Nicole Westbrook on November 7, 2012. The song was written and produced by Patrice Wilson and he took part in the music video released online. It was featured live on Thanksgiving Day broadcast on Anderson Live.

Another young artist regularly featured by Wilson was Alison Gold. On January 1, 2013, Patrice released rap group Tweenchronic's song, "Skip Rope" made up of Alison and Stacey. After a second release "ABCDEFG" as a solo release by Gold, she had her chart success with the release of "Chinese Food" on October 14, 2013. Wilson was accused of cultural insensitivity for, among other things, using Japanese geisha costumes to portray Chinese culture, but he has denied these claims, saying that he had no plans to disrespect anyone. The more controversial Alison Gold release "Shush Up" in 2014 was later taken down from his official channel. Other releases include Abby Victor in "Storybook", Katie Belle in "Born for This", Lexi Sullivan in "Hot Stuff", Ellie Soufi in "Hysterical", Maddie Shy in "Stronger" and MS in "Rewind - Replay".

References

External links
 Pato Music on YouTube

Living people
1983 births
ARK Music Factory
Nigerian emigrants to the United States
Nigerian people of British descent
Nigerian people of Irish descent
Nigerian record producers
Nigerian songwriters
Whitworth University alumni